The 2023 UCI America Tour is the 19th season of the UCI America Tour. The season began on 23 October 2022 with the Vuelta a Guatemala and will end in October 2023.

The points leader, based on the cumulative results of previous races, wears the UCI America Tour cycling jersey. Throughout the season, points are awarded to the top finishers of stages within stage races and the final general classification standings of each of the stages races and one-day events. The quality and complexity of a race also determines how many points are awarded to the top finishers, the higher the UCI rating of a race, the more points are awarded.

The UCI ratings from highest to lowest are as follows:
 Multi-day events: 2.1 and 2.2
 One-day events: 1.1 and 1.2

Events

References

External links
 

2023
2023 in North American sport
2023 in South American sport
America Tour
UCI America Tour